(born May 1, 1969 in Okayama, Japan) is a professional Go player.

Biography
Shigeaki became a professional in 1983. He was promoted to 9 dan by the Kansai Ki-in in 1995. He is a pupil of Akagi Kazuo. He currently resides in Okayama, Japan.

Titles & runners-up

External links
GoBase profile
GoGameWorld profile

1969 births
Japanese Go players
Living people